Odell K. Whitney (December 31, 1884 – June 11, 1967) was an American politician from the U.S. state of South Dakota. He served as lieutenant governor of South Dakota from 1931 through 1933.

Whitney attended the University of South Dakota College of Law and was admitted to the bar in 1911. He served in the South Dakota Senate from 1925 through 1930, and as Lieutenant Governor of South Dakota from 1931 through 1933. Whitney was appointed as a circuit court judge in 1946, and retired in 1961.

References

External links

1884 births
1967 deaths
People from Haakon County, South Dakota
Lieutenant Governors of South Dakota
Republican Party South Dakota state senators
University of South Dakota School of Law alumni
South Dakota lawyers
20th-century American politicians
20th-century American lawyers